Bobby and  Sanjay are an Indian screenwriter duo working in Malayalam cinema. They are the sons of the actor Prem Prakash.

Career

Films 
Bobby and Sanjay are scriptwriters in Malayalam films. They started their film career by scripting Sibi Malayil's Ente Veedu Appuvinteyum (2003). Their second bigscreen venture Notebook (2006) was directed by Rosshan Andrrews. They were able to incorporate several contemporary themes including teenage pregnancy in the film, which has a cult following amongst youngsters of Kerala. In 2010, they scripted the film Traffic. They worked for more than two years to complete the scripting of Traffic, which was inspired by true incidents. The film was very well received in Kerala. They associated again with Rosshan Andrrews for the film Casanovva (2012), which was one of the costliest Malayalam films of the time. The film was met with scathing reviews and dismal box office collections and was voted as one of the most disappointing films of the year 2012. Their next work Ayalum Njanum Thammil, directed by Lal Jose centred on a committed senior doctor and an irresponsible junior doctor and, the film, through their relationship, portrayed the medical profession. The film was one of the most successful films of the year and won numerous accolades including four Kerala State Film Awards. In 2013, they associated for the third time with Rosshan Andrrews in the film Mumbai Police. The film was a huge box office success and earned very good reviews; a critic from Sify.com called the film "one of the best films to have emerged from Malayalam cinema in a long time." In 2014, they associated with Rosshan Andrrews for the fourth time, in How Old Are You, which marked the return of ace actress Manju Warrier to cinema after a sabbatical of over a decade.

Television 
Bobby and Sanjay scripted the television serial Avicharitham (2004), that was telecast in Asianet for a period of 40 days. The serial won them critical acclaim and several accolades including the TV Critics Awards. Bobby and Sanjay had also scripted for a serial named Avasthantharangal (Mikhayelinte Santhathikal). The lead role in this serial was played by their uncle and veteran actor Jose Prakash.

Filmography

Television

References

External links 
 
 
 Bobby-Sanjay at Facebook

Screenwriters from Kerala
Malayali people
Living people
Kerala State Film Award winners
Indian screenwriting duos
Malayalam screenwriters
21st-century Indian dramatists and playwrights
Year of birth missing (living people)
21st-century Indian screenwriters